Leptothorax duloticus is a species of especially hostile slave-maker ant in the subfamily Myrmicinae. It is endemic to the United States.

It has been observed to engage in a behavior known as alloparental care, which is seen in many other animal species, like the fathead minnow.

References

duloticus
Slave-making ants
Hymenoptera of North America
Insects of the United States
Insects described in 1937
Taxonomy articles created by Polbot